Kodasalli Dam is built across the Kali River (Kalinadi) in Yellapura taluk of Uttara Kannada district of Karnataka state, India. This dam was built by Karnataka Power Corporation Limited. This electric power generating station  is classified as hydroelectric power station. It also is a major source of irrigation.

External links
Kodisalli Dam controversy
Kodasalli Dam 

 

Dams in Karnataka
Buildings and structures in Uttara Kannada district
Tourist attractions in Uttara Kannada district
Year of establishment missing